The 1981 Fischer-Grand Prix was a men's tennis tournament played on indoor hard courts at the Wiener Stadthalle in Vienna in Austria that was part of the 1981 Volvo Grand Prix. It was the seventh edition of the tournament and was held from 19 October until 25 October 1981. First-seeded Ivan Lendl won the singles title.

Finals

Singles

 Ivan Lendl defeated  Brian Gottfried 1–6, 6–0, 6–1, 6–2
 It was Lendl's 7th singles title of the year and the 14th of his career.

Doubles

 Steve Denton /  Tim Wilkison defeated  Sammy Giammalva Jr. /  Fred McNair 4–6, 6–3, 6–4
 It was Denton's 3rd title of the year and the 7th of his career. It was Wilkison's 2nd title of the year and the 5th of his career.

References

External links
 ATP tournament profile
 ITF tournament edition details

 
Fischer-Grand Prix
Vienna Open